Glavin is the surname of the following people
Anthony Glavin (1945–2006), Irish poet and professor of music 
John Glavin (born 1944), British sprint canoer
Ronnie Glavin (born 1951), Scottish football midfielder
Terry Glavin (born 1955), Canadian author and journalist 
Tony Glavin (born 1958), Scottish football midfielder

See also
Glavina
Professor Frink

English-language surnames